Garrowhill railway station serves the Garrowhill and Barlanark areas of Glasgow, Scotland. The railway station is 4¾ miles (7 km) east of Glasgow Queen Street railway station on the North Clyde Line and is managed by ScotRail.

Services 

Monday to Saturday daytimes:

Half-hourly service towards Edinburgh Waverley
Half-hourly service towards Airdrie 
Half-hourly service towards Balloch via Glasgow Queen Street Low Level
Half-hourly service towards Helensburgh Central via Glasgow Queen Street Low Level (As of August 2016 this service no longer calls at Shettleston, Cartyne and Bellgrove. Passengers for these stations please use the half-hourly service towards Balloch instead.)

Evening services are as follows: 
Half-hourly service towards Airdrie via all stations
Half-hourly service towards Balloch via Glasgow Queen Street Low Level

Sunday services are as follows: 
Half-hourly service towards Edinburgh Waverley 
Half-hourly service towards Helensburgh Central

Facilities
The station does not have a dedicated car park but cycle storage is available.  The station is staffed during working hours from Monday to Friday.

References

External links 

Railway stations in Glasgow
Former London and North Eastern Railway stations
Railway stations in Great Britain opened in 1936
SPT railway stations
Railway stations served by ScotRail
1936 establishments in Scotland
Baillieston